Madeleine Elsie Jane Christie (18 January 1904 – 2 February 1996) was a Scottish actress.

Madeleine Christie studied at the Central School of Speech and Drama, London.

Christie was the mother of actress Amanda Walker, and mother-in-law of Patrick Godfrey.

Selected filmography
 The Old Lady Shows Her Medals (1952)
 Electric Dreams (1984)

Selected television
 The Prime of Miss Jean Brodie (STV)
 Take the High Road  (1980)
 The Play on One: The Dunroamin' Rising  (1988)

References

External links
 

1904 births
1996 deaths
British film actresses
British television actresses
Actresses from Edinburgh
20th-century British actresses